The 1984 United States presidential election in Wisconsin took place on November 6, 1984. All 50 states and the District of Columbia, were part of the 1984 United States presidential election. State voters chose 11 electors to the Electoral College, which selected the president and vice president of the United States.

Wisconsin was won by incumbent United States President Ronald Reagan of California, who was running against former Vice President Walter Mondale of Minnesota. Reagan ran for a second time with incumbent Vice President and former C.I.A. Director George H. W. Bush of Texas, and Mondale ran with Representative Geraldine Ferraro of New York, the first major party female candidate for the vice presidency. This would be the last time Wisconsin would vote for a Republican in a presidential election until Donald Trump won the state in 2016, and the last time Wisconsin would vote for a Republican with a majority of the vote.

The presidential election of 1984 was a very partisan election for Wisconsin, with over 99 percent of the electorate voting only either Democratic or Republican, though eight additional parties appeared on the ballot. Reagan carried a majority in most of Wisconsin's counties, whereas Mondale carried a majority in ten, mostly in the far northwest of the state, along the Lake Superior coast and across from Minnesota's Iron Range, along with Milwaukee County, Dane County, Kenosha County, and almost entirely Native American Menominee County. Two relatively geographically isolated rural counties--Pepin County in west-central Wisconsin and Portage County in central Wisconsin—rounded out the list; these were Mondale's two weakest wins. One county, Polk County in the northwest, gave neither nominee a majority, but gave Reagan a plurality.

Reagan posted strong wins along the whole of eastern Wisconsin, apart from Manitowoc, Sheboygan, and Racine Counties, and the two Mondale wins in Milwaukee and Kenosha. He posted a particularly strong win in suburban Waukesha County, which he won by over thirty points. In western Wisconsin, Reagan won most of the counties but his margins tended to be weaker. Wisconsin weighed in for this election as 10 points more Democratic than the national average. , this is the last election in which Eau Claire County, La Crosse County, Rock County, and Iowa County voted for a Republican presidential candidate, as well as the last election in which a Republican candidate won more than 40% of the vote in either Dane County or Milwaukee County, both of which have voted Democratic in increasingly large margins since.

Reagan won the election in Wisconsin by a 9-point margin. While a sound victory, this made Wisconsin 9.1% more Democratic than the nation, signaling the consolidation of a new, short-lived Democratic base in the Upper Midwest. Before 1976, Wisconsin had tended to lean Republican in close elections, voting narrowly for Nixon in 1960 and 1968. In 1976, it narrowly, but surprisingly, voted for Carter. Four years later, Wisconsin would become one of only ten states to back Michael Dukakis, making George H. W. Bush the first Republican to win the White House despite losing Wisconsin to the Democratic nominee. (Calvin Coolidge had won in 1924 despite losing Wisconsin to the third-party Progressive candidate, and Wisconsinite, Robert La Follette.) Cracks in this new base were evident as early as 2000, when Al Gore carried Wisconsin by less than 1%. In 2016, Donald Trump became the first Republican to carry Wisconsin since 1984. It returned to the Democratic camp in 2020, although again by less than 1%.

Democratic platform
Walter Mondale accepted the Democratic nomination for presidency after pulling narrowly ahead of Senator Gary Hart of Colorado and Rev. Jesse Jackson of Illinois - his main contenders during what would be a very contentious Democratic primary. During the campaign, Mondale was vocal about reduction of government spending, and, in particular, was vocal against heightened military spending on the nuclear arms race against the Soviet Union, which was reaching its peak on both sides in the early 1980s.

Taking a (what was becoming the traditional liberal) stance on the social issues of the day, Mondale advocated for gun control, the right to choose regarding abortion, and strongly opposed the repeal of laws regarding institutionalized prayer in public schools. He also criticized Reagan for his economic marginalization of the poor, stating that Reagan's reelection campaign was "a happy talk campaign," not focused on the real issues at hand.

A very significant political move during this election: the Democratic Party nominated Representative Geraldine Ferraro to run with Mondale as Vice-President. Ferraro is the first female candidate to receive such a nomination in United States history. She said in an interview at the 1984 Democratic National Convention that this action "opened a door which will never be closed again," speaking to the role of women in politics.

Republican platform

By 1984, Reagan was very popular with voters across the nation as the President who saw them out of the economic stagflation of the early and middle 1970's, and into a period of (relative) economic stability.

The economic success seen under Reagan was politically accomplished (principally) in two ways. The first was initiation of deep tax cuts for the wealthy, and the second was a wide-spectrum of tax cuts for crude oil production and refinement, namely, with the 1980 Windfall profits tax cuts. These policies were augmented with a call for heightened military spending, and the cutting of social welfare programs for the poor. Collectively called "Reaganomics", these economic policies were established through several pieces of legislation passed between 1980 and 1987.

These new tax policies also arguably curbed several existing tax loopholes, preferences, and exceptions, but Reaganomics is typically remembered for its trickle down effect of taxing poor Americans more than rich ones. Reaganomics has (along with legislation passed under presidents George H. W. Bush and Bill Clinton) been criticized by many analysts as "setting the stage" for economic troubles in the United States after 2007, such as the Great Recession.

Virtually unopposed during the Republican primaries, Reagan ran on a campaign of furthering his economic policies. Reagan vowed to continue his "war on drugs," passing sweeping legislation after the 1984 election in support of mandatory minimum sentences for drug possession.  Furthermore, taking a (what was becoming the traditional conservative) stance on the social issues of the day, Reagan strongly opposed legislation regarding comprehension of gay marriage, abortion, and (to a lesser extent) environmentalism, regarding the final as simply being bad for business.

Results

Results by county

See also
 Presidency of Ronald Reagan
 United States presidential elections in Wisconsin

References

Wisconsin
1984
1984 Wisconsin elections